The Federal University of Agriculture, Abeokuta is one of the higher institutions of learning owned and run by the Federal government of Nigeria.

History

The Federal University of Agriculture, Abeokuta, Ogun State, or FUNAAB, was established on 1 January 1988 by the Federal Government when four universities of technology, earlier merged in 1984, were demerged. This led to the creation of the first two universities of agriculture in Abeokuta and Makurdi.

On the same date, Professor Nurudeen Olorun-Nimbe Adedipe was appointed the pioneer Vice-Chancellor of the university.  Professor Adedipe officially assumed duty on 28 January 1988. For many years the date which Professor Adedipe assumed duty was wrongly adopted as the foundation day.  Following a revisit to the instrument setting up the university, a council decision at its 53rd statutory meeting in June 2010 reverted the foundation date to 1 January 1988 as prescribed by the law which established the university.

Prior to the emergence of FUNAAB, the Federal Government had established Federal University of Technology, Abeokuta (FUTAB) in 1983. Then, in 1984, it was merged with the University of Lagos and had its name changed to the College of Science and Technology, Abeokuta (COSTAB), before the demerger of January, 1988.

The university started off from the old campus of Abeokuta Grammar School, Isale-Igbein near the city centre. It completed its movement to its permanent site along Alabata Road in 1997.

At the initial stage, five colleges were introduced in the university in October 1988 as follows:
College of Agricultural Management, Rural development and Communication Studies (COLAMRUCS), which name was later changed to COLAMRUD (College of Agriculture Management and Rural Development)
College of Animal Science and Livestock Production (COLANIM)
College of Environmental Resources Management (COLERM)
College of Natural Sciences (COLNAS)

College of Natural Science was reformed and redrafted into 2 colleges which are College of Physical Sciences (COLPHYS) and College of Biological Science (COLBIOS)
College of Plant Science and Crop Production (COLPLANT)

Two additional colleges, College of Engineering (COLENG) and College of Veterinary Medicine (COLVET) were introduced in March, 2002. During the 2008/2009 session, the College of Agricultural Management, Rural Development and Communication Studies was split into two, with two new colleges emerging as follows:
College of Food Science and Human Ecology (COLFHEC)
College of Agricultural Management and Rural Development (COLAMRUD)
The newest college is College of Management Sciences (COLMAS)

The university is one of the three universities of agriculture in Nigeria, the other being in Makurdi (Benue State) and Umudike (Abia State). The university started at its mini-campus in Isale-Igbein in the heart of Abeokuta, the capital of Ogun State. In December 1997 it moved to its permanent site on a 10,000-hectare campus which is located next to the Ogun-Oshun River Basin Development Authority on the Abeokuta-Ibadan road in the North Eastern end of the city, 15 km from Abeokuta City Centre.

Governing council

The first council was constituted on 18 May 1989 under the chairmanship of Alhaji Muhammadu Jega, former Head of Service and Secretary to the Sokoto State Government. On 1 September 1990, the council was reconstituted with some changes for five years with Alhaji Muhammadu Jega retained as chairman. The second governing council was constituted in 2000 for five years, with Alhaji Sanni Bagiwa Idris as chairman. The third council came on board in 2005 and was dissolved in November, 2007 by the Federal Government. Elder Brigadier General (Rtd.) Bassey Asuquo, a one-time Military Administrator of Kogi, Edo and Delta States respectively, was the chairman. The fourth council was constituted in January 2009 with Mr. Raphael Oluwole Osayameh as chairman and immediate past Pro-Chancellor.  Chief Lawrence Ayinde Osayemi was Pro-Chancellor and Chairman of Council. Senator Adeseye Ogunlewe Kingsley, a one time Minister of works and Service of the Federation, a former Senator of the Federal Republic of Nigeria is the immediate Pro-Chancellor and Chairman of the Governing Council. Presently, Dr. (Barr.) Aboki Zhawa, an astute administrator, a legal luminary, educationalist and politician is the Pro-Chancellor and the Chairman of the Governing Council.

Chancellors

Since inception, FUNAAB has had four Chancellors: 
 Alhaji Kabir Umar, the Emir of Katagum in Bauchi State, appointed in 1989, 
 Oba Adeyinka Oyekan, the Oba of Lagos (now late). He served from 2001 to 2003, 
 Obi (Prof.) Joseph Chike Edozien, the Asagba of Asaba in Delta State, a renowned and retired Professor of Medicine of the University of Ibadan is the immediate past Chancellor. 
The current Chancellor is Edidem Ekpo Okon Abasi-Otu (V), the Obong of Calabar, Natural Ruter and the grand Patriarch of the Efik-Ebutytu Kingdom, Rex Maximum Calabarees and the defender of the Christian Faith.

Vice-Chancellors

 The foundation Vice-Chancellor was Professor Nurudeen Olorunimbe Adedipe, who served for two terms of four years each: 8 January 1988 to 31 December 1991 and 1 January 1992 to 31 December 1995,
 The second Vice-Chancellor was Professor Julius Amioba Okojie, who acted from 1 January 1996 till 2 September 1996, when he became a substantive Vice-Chancellor and served for one term of five-year which ended on 31 August 2001,
 The third Vice-Chancellor was Professor Israel Folorunso Adu, who served from 1 September 2001 to 31 August 2006.
 Professor Ishola Adamson acted as Vice-Chancellor from 1 September 2006 till 24 May 2007
 The fourth Vice-Chancellor, Professor Oluwafemi Olaiya Balogun was appointed from 24 May 2007 till 23 May 2012.
 Professor Olusola Bamidele Oyewole was appointed the fifth substantive Vice-Chancellor at the 70th Statutory Meeting of the university's Governing Council of Friday, 20 April 2012. He assumed office on 24 May 2012 – till 24 May 2017.
 Professor Ololade Ade Enikuomehin was recommended and appointed as the Acting Vice-Chancellor by the Senate of the university at its special meeting on 24 May 2017 and served in that capacity till 31 October 2017.
 The sixth substantive Vice-Chancellor and South Western Nigeria Coordinator (2016–2017), African Cassava Agronomy Initiative (ACAI), Professor Felix Kolawole Salako took over the baton of leadership on 1 November 2017 and ended his tenure in November 2022.
 Professor Olusola Kehinde was appointed as the Acting Vice-Chancellor by the Senate of the university at its special meeting on 1 November 2022.

Deputy Vice-Chancellors
 Professor G. M. Babatunde: 1 September 1994
 Professor Julius Okojie: 1 October 1994 to 31 December 1995
 Professor I. F. Adu: December, 2000 (2 terms)
 Professor T.O. Tayo: 7 December 2000 to 6 December 2004 (2 terms)
 Professor A.R.T. Solarin: 7 December 2004 to 6 December 2006.
 Professor I.C. Eromosele, DVC (Academic): 14 September 2007 to 17 September 2009.
 Professor O.J. Ariyo, DVC (Development): 14 September 2007 to 17 September 2009.
 Professor C.F.I Onwuka, DVC (Academic): 18 September 2009 to 17 September 2011.
 Professor S.T.O Lagoke, DVC (Development): 18 September 2009 to 17 September 2011.
 Professor T.A. Arowolo, DVC (Academic): 18 September 2011 to December 2013.
 Professor F. K. Salako, DVC (Development): 18 September 2011 to 6 January 2016 (2 terms).
 Professor M. A. Waheed, DVC (Academic): 1 January 2014 to 6 January 2016.
 Professor (Mrs.) C.O. Eromosele, DVC (Academic): 7 January 2016 till 7 January 2018
 Professor O.A. Enikuomehin, DVC (Development): 7 January 2016 till 23 May 2017
 Professor (Mrs.) Morenike Dipeolu, DVC (Academic): 8 January 2018 to 7 January 2020
Professor (Mrs.) Bolanle Akeredolu-Ale DVC (Academic): 8 January 2020 till date
 Professor L.O. Sanni, DVC (Development): 7 November 2017 to 6 November 2019.
Professor Clement Adeofun (Development): 7 November 2019 till date.

While the first five were the only Deputy Vice-Chancellors during their respective tenures, Professors Eromosele and Ariyo were appointed simultaneously as the first set of two Deputy Vice-Chancellors for the university, an initiative of the then Vice-Chancellor, Professor O.O. Balogun.

Academic programmes
The university has 179 academic programmes made up of 44 undergraduate programmes, 135 graduate programmes which include 22 Postgraduate diploma programmes, 57 Master's degree programmes and 56 Doctorate degree programmes.

University colleges are:

Academic Planning Unit
The Academic Planning Unit is the quality control unit of the university and the link between the university and the National Universities Commission. It is at the centre of all planning activities of the university. The unit is headed by a Director, Professor M.A. Waheed, a Principal Planning Officer, Mr. O.O. Bamgbose and other Planning Officers (Mrs. A.A. Akintunde, Mr. A.O. Kuforiji and Mr. S.A. Dada).

Library

Nimbe Adedipe Library was named in honour of the first Vice-Chancellor of the university, Professor Nurudeen Olorunnimbe Adedipe. The library building can accommodate 1000 users at a time.  The total collection of books at present is 54,000 titles.

The library started its automation programme in 1994 when it acquired through a World Bank Project, an IBM personal computer and the TINLIB library software designed for four work stations. This was later upgraded to ten work stations. The library has since migrated from the DOS based TINLIB software to a more versatile windows based GLAS (Graphical Library Automated System) software with the capability to operate 50 work stations within the library. OPAC is fully functional making it possible to catalogue books on line and for library clients to access such books immediately. In line with the latest technology advancement, the library during the 2012/13 session acquired KOHA an Integrated Library Management Software which enables users to access library resources services where they are.

Units, centers and other facilities

 Agricultural Media Resources and Extension center (AMREC) 
 Biotechnology Center
 Institute For Human Resources Development (INHURD) 
 Leventis Memorial Center for Learning 
 ICT Resource Center (ICTREC)
 The Health Center
 Institute of Food Security, Environmental Resources and Agricultural Research (IFSERAR) 
 Directorate of Environmental Management (DEM)  
 Directorate of University Farms (DUFARMS)
 Directorate of Technologist and Technical staff (DITTECS)
 Directorate of Grant Management
 Center for Innovation and Strategy in Learning and Teaching (CISLT)
 Sport Center 
 SERVICOM
 SIWES
 FMENV/FUNAAB Center
 Center for Community Based Farming Scheme (COBFAS)
 Center for Internationalization and partnerships (CENIP)
 Center for Entrepreneurial Studies (CENTS)
 Center of Excellence in Agricultural development and Sustainable Environment (CEADESE) 
 FUNAAB International School 
 FUNAAB Staff School 
 School of Arts 
 UNAAB Consult.
 The Physical Planning Unit
 The Academic Planning Unit
 The Procurement Unit
 The Public Relations
 The Internal Audit
 The Bursary Department
 The Registry
 Student Affairs Division
 Works and Services
 Office of Advancement
 Distance Learning Programme
 FUNAAB Micro-finance Bank
 FUNAAB Radio
 FUNAAB Zoo Park

Partnerships

The university has collaborative partnerships with institutions and establishments, including:
International Institute of Tropical Agriculture (IITA), Ibadan
National Seed Services (NSS), Ibadan
National Cereals Research Institute (NCRI), Badeggi
National Root Crops Research Institute (NRCRI), Umudike
Agricultural and Rural Management Training Institute (ARMTI), Ilorin
National Agricultural Extension and Research Liaison Services (NAERLS), Zaria
Farm Management Association of Nigeria (FAMAN)
Ogun State Agricultural Development Project (OGADEP), Abeokuta
Ministries of Agriculture and Water Resources of both Ogun and Lagos states
Federal Ministry of Environment
National Agricultural Land Development Authority (NALDA)
Afe Babalola University, Ado – Ekiti (ABUAD)
National Agricultural Research Project (NARP)
Pan-African Striga Control Network (PASCON), Accra
West African Rice Development Agency (WARDA), Ivory Coast
Federal Institute of Industrial Research (FIIRO), Oshodi, Lagos
Nestle Foods Plc.

Memoranda of Understanding (MOU's) have been signed with the institutions and collaboration activities are in progress.

At the international level, the Food and Agricultural Organisation (FAO), has entered into collaboration with the university in the areas of training and seminars. The British Council has established an academic link programme between FUNAAB and the University of Reading, and the University of Edinburgh, primarily, though not exclusively, in the areas of Plant and Animal Breeding and Seed Technology and Genetics, respectively. Others include the Macaulay Institute of Aberdeen, Scotland in the area of Sustainable Development, and the Africa Rice Center in Rice Science.

 The activities/projects carried out in the centre include:
 Processing of staff application forms for Tertiary Education Trust Fund (TETFUND) approval.
 Processing of application forms of staff sponsored by the University Management on Capacity Building Training Programmes in foreign countries.
 Processing and placement of academic staff on PhD, MSc and PhD bench work sponsored by TETFUND under Academic Staff Training and Development (AST&D) training programme in foreign institutions.

Achievements of the Centre for Internationalisation and Partnerships (CENIP)
 CENIP has processed TETFUND Conference Intervention Grants for members of staff to attend international conferences.
 CENIP has processed the placement of 26 academic staff on PhD, MSc and PhD bench work programmes sponsored by TETFUND under the Academic Staff Training & Development (AST&D) in foreign institutions.
 Federal University of Agriculture Foreign African Scholarship Scheme (FUFASS), facilitated and sponsored by Federal University Agriculture, Abeokuta has graduated twenty-One students from the Republics of Sierra-Leone, Liberia and the Gambia under the Skills Acquisition Programmes of the university.
 CENIP has trained members of staff under the FUNAAB Staff Capacity Building/Training Programmes in foreign countries.
 CENIP has organized four international lectures and two international workshops/trainings in conjunction with international organizations.

Notable alumni

Amongst the alumni of the Federal University of Agriculture, Abeokuta and other institutions that fall under that banner are:
Lateef O. Sanni, First FUNAAB graduate to become a professor and DVC.
Japheth J. Omojuwa, Social commentator and blogger
Oluseun Onigbinde, techpreneur
Kizz Daniel, musician

Other university lectures
 30th Anniversary Maiden Distinguished Lecture Series:- Professor Julius A. Okojie 25 April 2018: A robust Regulatory system: An imperative quality assurance in Nigeria Universities
2019 Matriculation commencement Lecture:-   Professor Olusegun Ayodeji Osinowo 18 July 2019: Sailing to success
Valedictory Lecture:-  Professor Olufunmilayo Ayoka Adebambo 27 March 2019:The days of small beginning
Text of an invited talk:-professor Steve o. Afolami : A centre of excellence:its hilltops and valleys, victories and challenges and the way forward.

References

External links
Federal University of Agriculture Abeokuta
Nigerian Universities Commission

 
Forestry education
Educational institutions established in 1988
Forestry in Nigeria
1988 establishments in Nigeria
Federal universities of Nigeria
Agricultural universities and colleges in Nigeria
Universities and colleges in Abeokuta